The Portland Plaza is a condominium skyscraper in downtown Portland, Oregon, United States. The Portland Plaza was designed by the firm of DMJM and was completed in 1973. The building is sometimes referred to as the "Norelco Building", owing to its metallic siding and its footprint bearing a resemblance to an electric shaver.

Enjoying a location almost directly west of the Keller Auditorium and the Ira Keller Fountain, Portland Plaza creates a late mid-20th century modernist feel to the area. Along with the Keller Fountain, the building has been featured on an album cover of the band Shades of Christ, and appeared as a futuristic building in the PBS film version of Ursula K. Le Guin's The Lathe of Heaven.

See also
Architecture of Portland, Oregon
List of tallest buildings in Portland, Oregon

References

External links
 
 
 Portland Plaza (Emporis)

1973 establishments in Oregon
Residential buildings completed in 1973
Residential skyscrapers in Portland, Oregon